Edith Nakiyingi (born 15 October 1968) is a retired Ugandan middle-distance runner who competed primarily in the 800 metres. She represented her country at the 1992 Summer Olympics as well as two outdoor and one indoor World Championships.

College career
Nakiyingi competed as an athlete in both cross country and track & field as Iowa State. She finished her career a two-time NCAA champion, seven-time All-American, 11-time Big Eight champion, and the 1992 Big Eight Athlete of the Year.

She captured her first NCAA track & field title in 1989, winning the 800-meter run in an NCAA meet record of 2:05.68. That season, Nakiyingi won two Big Eight indoor titles, the 1,000-meter and distance medley relay and the 800-meter run in outdoor competition. Nakiyingi again won the NCAA 800-meter indoor title in 1991 in Indianapolis with a time of 2:04.84. At the conclusion of Nakiyingi's career, she owned three of the four fastest 800-meter times in NCAA indoor meet history.

In cross country she finished 15th at the 1989 NCAA Championships and then lead ISU to the 1990 Big Eight Conference cross country title.

In 2001 she was inducted into the Iowa State Cyclones Hall of Fame.

Competition record

Personal bests

References

1968 births
Living people
Ugandan female middle-distance runners
Olympic athletes of Uganda
Athletes (track and field) at the 1992 Summer Olympics
World Athletics Championships athletes for Uganda
African Games silver medalists for Uganda
African Games medalists in athletics (track and field)
Athletes (track and field) at the 1987 All-Africa Games
Competitors at the 1991 Summer Universiade
20th-century Ugandan women
21st-century Ugandan women